Sebastián Esteban Varas Moreno (born August 1, 1988) is a Chilean footballer currently playing for  in the Segunda División Profesional de Chile as a striker.

Career
A product of Everton de Viña del Mar, Varas has an extensive career in his homeland.

In February 2023, he joined  in the Segunda División Profesional de Chile.

Titles
 San Luis Quillota 2009 Primera B

References

External links
 
 

1988 births
Living people
Sportspeople from Viña del Mar
Chilean footballers
Everton de Viña del Mar footballers
O'Higgins F.C. footballers
San Luis de Quillota footballers
Rangers de Talca footballers
Ñublense footballers
Unión Española footballers
Cobresal footballers
Puerto Montt footballers
Chilean Primera División players
Primera B de Chile players
Segunda División Profesional de Chile players
Association football forwards